Nam Hang is the name of several places in Hong Kong:

 Nam Hang, Tai Po District, a village in Tai Po District
 Nam Hang Tsuen, a village in the Shap Pat Heung area of Yuen Long District